Lendenfeld may refer to:

 Robert J. Lendlmayer von Lendenfeld (1858–1913), Austrian zoologist, alpinist and traveller
 Lendenfeld Peak, the sixth-highest mountain in New Zealand